Marlieux is a commune in the Ain department in eastern France. Marlieux—Châtillon station has rail connections to Bourg-en-Bresse and Lyon.

Geography
The river Chalaronne forms part of the commune's western border.

Climate
Marlieux has a oceanic climate (Köppen climate classification Cfb).

Population

See also
Communes of the Ain department

References

Communes of Ain
Ain communes articles needing translation from French Wikipedia